Zawadowski (feminine: Zawadowski) is a Polish-language surname. It may be the surname of a noble family bearing the Rawa coat of arms. It may originate from one of the location named Zawadów. The Russianized form is Zavadovsky. Notable people with this surname include:

 (born 1983), Polish writer, screenwriter and translator
 Wacław Zawadowski (1891–1982), Polish painter
 Witold Zawadowski (1888–1980), Polish physician
 (1899-1978), lawyer, consular officer and diplomat, Minister of Foreign Affairs in the Polish Government in Exile

See also
 

Polish-language surnames